The Kosrae starling, also known as  Kosrae Island starling, and formerly as Kusaie Mountain starling, (Aplonis corvina) is an extinct bird from the family of starlings (Sturnidae). It was endemic to the montane forests on the island of Kosrae which belong to the Caroline Islands in the south-western Pacific.

Description
 
It reached a length between 20 and 25.4 centimetres. It was crow-like, glossy black and had a long curved bill as well as a long tail.

Extinction
The Kosrae starling is only known by five specimens which were obtained between December 1827 and January 1828 by the Kittlitz Expedition. Kittlitz described the bird in 1833. Three skins can be seen in the Museum of Saint Petersburg in Russia and two further in the Museum Naturalis in Leiden. In 1880 an expedition led by Otto Finsch was unable to find this bird. Another survey by the Whitney South Seas Expedition of the American Museum of Natural History in 1931 proved that this species was extinct. Its extinction was most likely caused by rats which escaped from whaling vessels during the 19th century and became widespread on Kosrae.

References

Bibliography
Greenway, James (1967): Extinct and Vanishing Birds of the World
Day, David (1981): The Doomsday Book of Animals
Fuller, Errol (2000): Extinct Birds
Flannery, Tim & Schouten, Peter (2001): A Gap in Nature

Citations

External links

BirdLife Species Factsheet
Biodiversity Heritage Library: Check-list of birds of the world. (1962)
Biodiversity Heritage Library:  University of Kansas publications, Museum of Natural History. (1951)
Catalogue of Life: Annual Checklist
London Natural History Museum: A picture of five specimens

Kosrae starling
Birds of the Federated States of Micronesia
Endemic fauna of the Federated States of Micronesia
Extinct birds of Oceania
Articles containing video clips
Kosrae starling
Taxa named by Heinrich von Kittlitz